Habronattus alachua is a species of jumping spider in the family Salticidae. It is found in the United States.

References

Salticidae
Articles created by Qbugbot
Spiders described in 1987